"Sofa" is a composition by American musician Frank Zappa, released in 1975 on One Size Fits All. In 1993, the year of Zappa's death, Steve Vai covered "Sofa" for Zappa's tribute album Zappa's Universe. The cover won a Grammy Award for Best Rock Instrumental Performance in 1994. This was Vai's first of three Grammies.

Appearances 
Originally, "Sofa" was only performed in concert and was part of a longer composition around the Flo and Eddie era of Zappa's music, when Mark Volman pretended to be a sofa. In 1975, Sofa made its first album appearance on Frank Zappa's album One Size Fits All as an instrumental version and a vocal version ("Sofa No. 1" and "Sofa No. 2"). There is a huge sofa in the center of the album cover for One Size Fits All, and the album's initials, "OSFA", can be re-arranged to spell "SOFA". In the same year, "Sofa No. 2" was released as a single in Germany and referred to as "Du bist mein Sofa". The same track as "Sofa No. 1", now only titled "Sofa", appeared on the 1976 live album Zappa in New York. On the album You Can't Do That on Stage Anymore, Vol. 1, "Sofa #1" contains the vocals and "Sofa #2" is the instrumental. On both One Size Fits All and You Can't Do That on Stage Anymore, Vol. 1, "Sofa No./#1" is track 3, while "Sofa No./#2" ends each album. It was also referred to as "Divan" on the album Playground Psychotics. "Sofa" is one of the most referenced Zappa songs throughout his discography.

Lyrics and meaning

The vocal version of "Sofa" contains lyrics in both German and English. According to critics, because it contains German it stood out the most on the album. The English lyrics sing about being various parts of nature (the heavens, the water, the clouds), while the lyrics in German explain how they are "the sofa's chrome dinette" and "all days and all nights". "Sofa" was a result of Zappa's fascination with the German people as he toured in Europe.

Ya Hozna

"Ya Hozna", from the 1984 album Them or Us, includes vocal parts "Sofa No.2" played backwards. It also contains parts of "Lonely Little Girl" (from We're Only in It for the Money) and unused material from "Valley Girl"  (from Ship Arriving Too Late to Save a Drowning Witch) played backwards.

Single track list

7"

A. "Du bist mein Sofa" - 2:38 
B. "Stink-Foot" - 4:25

References

1976 songs
Frank Zappa songs
Songs written by Frank Zappa
Song recordings produced by Frank Zappa